Sonic Boom is a CGI-animated series, produced by Sega of America, Inc. and Technicolor Productions in collaboration with Lagardère Thématiques and Jeunesse TV, respectively for channels Cartoon Network, Canal J, and Gulli.  The series follows the adventures of Sonic, Tails, Knuckles, Amy, and Sticks, who all try to foil the Doctor Eggman's evil plans to take over their island in order to build his own theme park. The series premiered on Cartoon Network in the United States on November 8, 2014 and on Canal J and Gulli on November 19, 2014 and on Boomerang in the United Kingdom on June 1, 2015. The series has aired 104 episodes, with each being 11 minutes long. 

The second season premiered on October 29, 2016 on Cartoon Network, while the rest of the season started airing on Boomerang on November 12, 2016. The second season concluded on November 18, 2017, and there have been no plans to continue the show since then.

Series overview

Episodes

Season 1 (2014–15)

Season 2 (2016–17)
Starting this season, all of the new episodes now air on Boomerang.

References

Animated series based on Sonic the Hedgehog
Lists of American children's animated television series episodes
Lists of French animated television series episodes